Club Deportivo Ebro is a Spanish football club in Zaragoza, in the autonomous community of Aragon. Founded in 1942, it plays in Segunda División RFEF – Group 3, holding home games at Campo Municipal de Fútbol La Almozara, which has a capacity of 1,000 seats.

History

Club Deportivo Ebro was founded in two stages. Firstly, in 1942 by Mr. Calavia, competing in the Amateur Championship, since there was no Federation. Second, before the 1961-62 season the enthusiastic fans such as Victoriano Herrando and Domingo Vela (who were club's presidents), Santiago Sediles, Paulino Larena, José Cester, José Gallén, Armando Guerra and other members of the Board of Directors reestablished the club. In the 1970s the club played its home matches in different stadiums in Zaragoza such as Campo de Picarral and Campo de Miralbueno. The club successfully reached promotion to the Primera Regional with José Luis Bailera Martínez as a president. 

In 2015, CD Ebro promoted for the first time to Segunda División B after beating CD Varea in the promotion playoffs.

Stadium

Ebro played its home games until 2019 in La Almozara.

In 2019, the club agreed with the Aragonese Football Federation the use of the Estadio Pedro Sancho for the 2019–20 season.

Season to season

6 seasons in Segunda División B
1 season in Segunda División RFEF
19 seasons in Tercera División

Current squad

References

External links
Official website 
Futbolme team profile 
Club & stadium history Estadios de España 

Football clubs in Aragon
Sport in Zaragoza
Association football clubs established in 1942
1961 establishments in Spain